Killing Car (original title: Femme dangereuse,  Dangerous Woman, also known as The Blood Red Car) is a 1993 French surreal revenge thriller film directed by Jean Rollin.

Synopsis
A mysterious, young Asian woman enters a scrapyard where the salesman offers her payment-in-kind; the woman appears to be in favour of his service, but suddenly draws a gun and shoots him dead. The woman proceeds to steal a '58 Edsel Corsair, only to be disturbed by the salesman's girlfriend, who begins to shoot back. Following a brief shoot-out between the women, the girlfriend approaches a group of prostitutes. The woman gives chase, gunning down the prostitutes, while the girlfriend escapes, but is eventually located and killed. A little toy car is discovered amongst the body as a calling card as two detectives investigate the case, one the which, the senior detective, seems to be dismissive and is almost due for retirement, while the young detective is convinced there is more to it than meets the eye.

The mysterious woman tracks a couple, Robert and Sylvie, to a country farmhouse, killing Sylvie, and severely wounding Robert. Before he dies he realises that he and the woman were connected to an incident that occurred one year prior. A man named Marc and his girlfriend, Monique, arrive at the farmhouse to meet with Robert, to do an illegal deal over a stolen Goddess of Fertility statue, only to find the woman waiting for them and claiming to be an acquaintance of Robert's. Marc agrees to do the deal with her, but Monique is suspicious of her intentions. Monique goes to the barn and screams when she finds Robert and Sylvie's bodies. Marc runs to her aid and is shot dead, while Monique tries to defend herself, to no avail, the woman impales her with a pitchfork.

A photographer named Pascale returns from New York to Paris and meets with the woman to engage in modeling photo shoot. Pascale becomes unsettled by the woman's haunting appearance. Following a nude shoot, they are interrupted by Pascale's friend, Barbara, who suggests they do a shoot for fun with the woman as an executioner, while Barbara plays the victim. The woman goes into a trance and proceeds to cut Barbara's throat when Pascale is forced to slap her; this invokes a memory for the woman and she stabs Pascale. Barbara attempts to lead her to safety, but the pair are shot and killed. The detectives retrieve the negatives from Pascale's camera and by this point, with the stolen Edsel and the toy cars planted among the bodies, the woman has been dubbed "Car Woman".

The Car Woman's next victim is a young office worker who recognises the car parked in the street; she instantly remembers an incident that happened one year earlier and is shot an wounded by the Car Woman but manages to survive. She then auditions for the job of a night club dancer as a means of luring the owner, Sam Spade, to his death along with his current performer. Finally, she reveals her motive; one year ago she and her lover were involved in a car accident in the same Edsel. The Car Woman discovered the identities of those who drove on and failed to help and swore vengeance. She lastly murders two antique dealers where it becomes evident that someone has been assisting her along the way.

She made a promise to her disfigured lover by exacting revenge and kisses him goodbye before putting him out of his misery by shooting him. She goes to a deserted wasteland where her assistant is revealed to be the senior police detective and pays him for his services. She walks away, while the young detective discovers the truth. The senior detective attempts to bribe him before drawing his gun, but is killed first. In her despair, the Car Woman wanders off as her mission has come to an end.

Cast

Production
In 1991, Jean Rollin's career as a filmmaker began to rapidly decline. Having planned to produce his most latest feature, Charming Detectives, which was partially filmed, and the proposed television series Dracula's Return which was submitted for commission for France 3 in 1992, was not picked up. Both projects were ultimately abandoned.

Rollin eventually accepted a deal from Michel Gué, who financed Killing Car (working title Femme dangereuse). The film was produced in ten days beginning in November 1992, with additional scenes filmed within five days in January 1993. Filmed in Paris, the Parisian Suburbs and Viglain in Sologne, the production process proved to be difficult as a Siberian cold fell that winter. The role of the "Car Woman" was specifically written for Australian model Tiki Tsang, and it remains her only film credit. Jean-Loup Philippe, having appeared in several of Rollin's works, was cast in the role as an antique dealer. Many of the female roles were filled by models, in particular, Frédérique Haymann and Véronique Djaouti, had both appeared in Charming Detectives. Djaouti was a close friend of Rollin's and worked as an assistant director on Killing Car, as well as working with him on several of his other productions.

it was shot on a minimal budget ($100,000 in USD) and on 16 mm film. All usable print or negative is apparently lost and therefore the film cannot be remastered a proper high-definition restoration. Following the shoot, Rolling had taken seriously ill and post-production was postponed for several months.

The film had initial difficulty in finding distribution. While unable to release it theatrically, Rollin made a failed attempt to sell it to the television market, before it was eventually made available for a direct-to-video release. Due to its moderate success, particularly among Rollin fans, the film was released to international audiences several years later including its first-ever DVD release and television broadcast in the UK in October 2006.

Home media
Killing Car was released in France on DVD as part of the Jean Rollin collection from LCJ Editions on 15 November 2004.

In the United Kingdom, the film was released via Redemption Films on 23 January 2006. Special features for this set contain a stills gallery, video art and a partial Jean Rollin filmography. It misleadingly lists an exclusive interview between Jean Rollin and noted horror specialist and academic, Dr. Patricia McCormack, Redemption preview trailers and a bonus triple silence feature - 'Spell' music video from band Cadaveria. The set contains neither of these three features. However, they are available on previous Redemption releases. The film contains its original French language, and contains optional English subtitles.

The film was released in the US on 29 April 2008 by Redemption, and included a Rollin interview.

References

External links
 
 
 
 

1990s French-language films
Films shot in France
Films directed by Jean Rollin
French thriller films
Films set in France
1990s thriller films
French films about revenge
Films about murder
1990s French films